M. matthewi  may refer to:
 Mammut matthewi, an extinct mastodon species
 Moropus matthewi, an extinct mammal species endemic to North America during the Miocene

See also
 Matthewi